The Flat River is a stream in St. Francois County,  Missouri. It is a tributary of the Big River.

The stream source is at:  and the confluence is at: .

Flat River was so named on account of its flat banks. A variant name was "River la Platte".

See also
List of rivers of Missouri

References

Rivers of St. Francois County, Missouri
Rivers of Missouri